North Brighton railway station is located on the Sandringham line in Victoria, Australia. It serves the south-eastern Melbourne suburb of Brighton, and it opened on 19 December 1859 as Bay Street. It was renamed North Brighton on 1 January 1867, renamed Brighton on 1 December 1908, and renamed North Brighton on 1 January 1920.

History

North Brighton station opened on 19 December 1859, when the railway line was extended from Windsor. It remained a terminus until 21 December 1861, when the line was extended to Brighton Beach.

In 1956, the station was closed to goods services. In 1959, a crossover at the station was abolished.

On 4 May 2010, as part of the 2010/2011 State Budget, $83.7 million was allocated to upgrade North Brighton to a Premium Station, along with nineteen others. However, in March 2011, this was scrapped by the Baillieu Government.

Platforms and services

North Brighton has two side platforms. It is serviced by Metro Trains' Sandringham line services.

Platform 1:
  all stations services to Flinders Street

Platform 2:
  all stations services to Sandringham

Transport links

CDC Melbourne operates one route via North Brighton station, under contract to Public Transport Victoria:
 : Middle Brighton station – Chadstone Shopping Centre

Kinetic Melbourne operates one route via North Brighton station, under contract to Public Transport Victoria:
 : Westfield Southland – St Kilda station

Ventura Bus Lines operates two routes via North Brighton station, under contract to Public Transport Victoria:
  : Middle Brighton station – Blackburn station
 : to Westfield Southland

Gallery

References

External links
 Melway map at street-directory.com.au

Railway stations in Melbourne
Railway stations in Australia opened in 1859
Railway stations in the City of Bayside